Howard Spencer Yates (3 May 1913 – 8 November 1989) was an Australian athlete who competed in the 1934 British Empire Games and in the 1938 British Empire Games.

In 1934 he was a member of the Australian relay team which finished fourth in the 4×110 yards event. In the 100 yards competition he finished sixth and in the 220 yards contest he was eliminated in the semi-finals.

At the 1938 Empire Games he won the bronze medal with the Australian relay team in the 4×110 yards event. In the 220 yards competition he finished fifth and in the 100 yards contest he finished sixth again.

External links
commonwealthgames.com results
Howard Yates' grave

1913 births
1989 deaths
Australian male sprinters
Athletes (track and field) at the 1934 British Empire Games
Athletes (track and field) at the 1938 British Empire Games
Commonwealth Games bronze medallists for Australia
Commonwealth Games medallists in athletics
Medallists at the 1938 British Empire Games